Inglaterra Airport  is an airstrip in the lightly populated pampa of the Beni Department in Bolivia. The runway is near a large meander of the Yata River.

See also

Transport in Bolivia
List of airports in Bolivia

References

External links 
OpenStreetMap - Inglaterra
OurAirports - Inglaterra
Fallingrain - Inglaterra Airport

Airports in Beni Department